NK Mladost Cernik is a Croatian football club based in the village of Cernik in the Brod-Posavina County in Slavonia. , Mladost Cernik is currently playing in Croatian Third Football League East.

Association football clubs established in 1948
Football clubs in Croatia
Football clubs in Brod-Posavina County
1948 establishments in Croatia